KOFIA or kofia may refer to:
Korea Financial Investment Association, a self-regulatory body in South Korea
Kofia (hat), a brimless hat similar to a fez